Sir Henry Ashurst, 2nd Baronet (c. 1670–1732), of Waterstock House, Waterstock, Oxfordshire was a British politician who sat in the House of Commons from 1715 to 1722.

Ashurst was the only surviving son of Sir Henry Ashurst, 1st Baronet, MP of Waterstock and his wife Diana Paget, daughter  of William Paget, 6th Lord Paget. He probably matriculated at Christ's College, Cambridge in 1687 and was admitted at Middle Temple in 1689. From 1694 to 1710, he was manager of the government lottery. Before 1711, he married Elizabeth Draper, daughter of Sir Thomas Draper, 1st Baronet, of Sunninghill, Berkshire. He succeeded his father in the baronetcy on 13 April 1711.
 
At the 1715 general election Ashurst stood for Parliament at New Windsor, which was close to  his wife's property. He was initially defeated but was returned as Member of Parliament on petition on 14 April 1715. He voted for the Administration in all recorded divisions but did not stand again in 1722.

Ashurst died on 17 May 1732. He had no children and the baronetcy became extinct. Waterstock House, which had been built by his father, passed to William Henry Ashurst (1725–1807), who rebuilt it in 1787.

References

1670s births
1732 deaths
British MPs 1715–1722
Members of the Parliament of Great Britain for English constituencies
Baronets in the Baronetage of England